Weeds of National Significance (WoNS) is a list of the most problematic plant species in Australia as determined by the federal government. Initially a list of 20 taxa were listed and given a rank based on invasiveness, impacts, potential for spread, and socioeconomic and environmental values. An expanded list of 32 taxa was released in April 2012.

List of taxa
Note: The list of individual taxa is greater than the 32 WoNS.

See also

Invasive species in Australia
Environmental issues in Australia
Flora of Australia
List of invasive plant species in New South Wales

References

External links
Weeds of National Significance at Weeds Australia